The Mangaone River is a river of the Hawke's Bay region of New Zealand's North Island. Its source is numerous streams draining the slopes of the Te Waka Range in the Rukumoana Forest area. The river flows southeast then south through rugged hill country until it meets the Tutaekuri River. For most of its course it is deeply incised in the tephra, ignimbrite and lapilli volcanic rocks, which are a bit over 30,000 years old. The deep valleys are partly due to the soft rocks and partly to the rapid rise of the Mohaka Fault, at over  a year.

Totara was being felled along the river in the 1860s. The river suffers from pollution by nitrogen and phosphorus.

See also
List of rivers of New Zealand

References

Rivers of the Hawke's Bay Region
Rivers of New Zealand